Pleurosoriopsis is a genus of ferns in the family Polypodiaceae, subfamily Polypodioideae, according to the Pteridophyte Phylogeny Group classification of 2016 (PPG I). The genus has only one species, Pleurosoriopsis makinoi, native to China (north-central, south-central and Manchuria), Japan, Korea, and Primorsky Krai in Russia.

References

Monotypic fern genera
Polypodiaceae